Storm Uru (born 14 February 1985) is a New Zealand rower. He is from Ngāi Tahu tribe.

Uru was born in 1985 in Invercargill. His younger brother, Jade Uru, is also a rower. The broadcaster Tui Uru (1926–2013) was their great-aunt. Tui Uru's father, the Reform Party MP Henare Uru, was a great-grandfather to the rowers.

Storm Uru competed for New Zealand in Beijing at the 2008 Olympics. With Peter Taylor he finished 7th in the Men's lightweight double sculls at the 2008 Summer Olympics.

At the 2009 World Rowing Championships, Uru and Taylor won the gold medal in the lightweight double sculls, and took the bronze medal at the following year's World Championships.

At the 2012 Summer Olympics, Uru and Taylor won the bronze medal in the lightweight double sculls.

Uru rowed at Bow for the winning Oxford crew in the 2014 Boat Race.

References

External links 

 
 

1985 births
Living people
Sportspeople from Invercargill
Ngāi Tahu people
Olympic rowers of New Zealand
Olympic bronze medalists for New Zealand
Rowers at the 2008 Summer Olympics
Rowers at the 2012 Summer Olympics
New Zealand Māori sportspeople
Olympic medalists in rowing
Medalists at the 2012 Summer Olympics
Oxford University Boat Club rowers
World Rowing Championships medalists for New Zealand
Alumni of Saïd Business School